Gainsborough and Horncastle is a former county constituency represented in the House of Commons of the Parliament of the United Kingdom. It elected one Member of Parliament (MP) by the first past the post system of election. It existed from 1983 to 1997. The area of and around Horncastle is now in the constituency of Louth and Horncastle.

For elections prior to 1983, and from 1997, see Gainsborough.

Boundaries

The District of West Lindsey, and the District of East Lindsey wards of Binbrook, Donington on Bain, Horncastle, Roughton, Woodhall Spa, and Wragby.

Members of Parliament

Election results

Elections in the 1980s

Elections in the 1990s

References

Sources 

Parliamentary constituencies in Lincolnshire (historic)
Constituencies of the Parliament of the United Kingdom established in 1983